Jay R. Vargas (born July 29, 1938) is a retired United States Marine Corps colonel who served in the Vietnam War. He received the Medal of Honor for "conspicuous gallantry and intrepidity at the risk of his life above and beyond the call of duty" in 1968.

Vargas is one of four brothers who has served in combat in the United States Armed Forces in time of war — World War II, the Korean War, and the Vietnam War.

Education
Vargas attended high school in Winslow, Arizona where he was born. He graduated from Northern Arizona University in 1962 with a B.S. Degree in Education and completed a Master of Arts Degree with "Honors" at U.S International University in San Diego, California.

Marine Corps career
After completing The Basic School at Marine Corps Base Quantico, Virginia, in June 1963, Vargas was assigned to the 1st Battalion, 5th Marines, 1st Marine Division. For his actions in the Battle of Dai Do, Republic of Vietnam in 1968 as a captain, Vargas was awarded the Medal of Honor by President Richard M. Nixon in a May 1970 ceremony at the White House. He is also a graduate of the Amphibious Warfare School, the Command and Staff College, Quantico, Virginia, and the National War College, Washington, D.C.

Vargas served as a Weapons and Rifle Platoon Commander; Rifle Company Executive Officer; three times as a Rifle Company Commander (two of which were in combat); S-3 Operations Officer; Recruit Depot Series Commander; Instructor, Staff Planning School, LFTCPAC; Headquarters Company Commander, 3rd Marine Division; Commanding Officer and Executive Officer, 3rd Reconnaissance Battalion, 3rd Marine Division; Commanding Officer of the 7th Marine Regiment at Camp Pendleton from 10 August 1984 to 29 May 1986; Aide-de-Camp to the Deputy Commanding General, Fleet Marine Force, Pacific; Marine Officer Instructor, NROTC Unit, University of New Mexico; Head, Operations Branch, Headquarters Marine Corps, Washington D.C.; and as the Assistant Chief of Staff, G-4, 1st Marine Amphibious Force.

After almost thirty years of service, Vargas retired from the Marine Corps in 1992 as a colonel.

Medal of Honor
Medal of Honor citation:

Later years
After leaving the military, Vargas, a Republican, served as the Secretary of the California Department of Veterans Affairs from 1993 to 1998. On July 9, 2001, he was appointed to the position of Regional Veterans Liaison for the United States Department of Veterans Affairs by the Secretary of Veterans Affairs, Anthony J. Principi. He served in this position until January 2009.

Family
Jay Vargas, a Mexican-American, is one of four brothers who has served in the United States Armed Forces in time of war. Like Vargas, each of his brothers are decorated veterans — Angelo served at Iwo Jima in World War II; Frank fought on Okinawa in World War II; and Joseph served in the Korean War. In honor of his mother, Vargas had her name engraved on his Medal of Honor. She died before he received his Medal of Honor; he requested that her name be engraved on the medal and be added to the rolls. As such, the actual recorded recipient of this Medal of Honor is "VARGAS, M. Sando."

Military awards
Vargas' military decorations and awards include:

See also

 List of Medal of Honor recipients for the Vietnam War
 List of Hispanic Medal of Honor recipients
 Hispanics in the United States Marine Corps

Notes

References

Further reading
 
 Jordan, Kenneth N. Men of Honor: Thirty-Eight Highly Decorated Marines of World War II, Korea, and Vietnam,  A Schiffer Military History Book, 1997.
 Nolan, Keith William.  The Magnificent Bastards The Joint Army-Marine Defense of Dong Ha, 1968, Presidio Press, 1994. 

1938 births
Living people
United States Marine Corps personnel of the Vietnam War
United States Marine Corps Medal of Honor recipients
People from Winslow, Arizona
Military personnel from Arizona
Recipients of the Silver Star
Recipients of the Gallantry Cross (Vietnam)
United States Marine Corps officers
United States Marine Corps colonels
Vietnam War recipients of the Medal of Honor
California Republicans